Milan Talkies is a 2019 Indian Hindi-language romantic drama film directed by Tigmanshu Dhulia. Written by Dhulia, Kamal Pandey and Abhishek Mazumdar, the film stars Ali Fazal, Shraddha Srinath (her Hindi debut), Ashutosh Rana, Sanjay Mishra, Reecha Sinha and Sikandar Kher, with its plot revolving around a struggling film director, who wants to become the biggest filmmaker in India. It is the story how his life revolves around movies and how he falls in love in filmy style. It was released on 15 March 2019.

Plot 
An aspiring filmmaker and his lady-love find themselves in a fix after being met with violent opposition from the girl`s family members.

Cast 
Ali Fazal as Annu
Shraddha Srinath as Maithali
Tigmanshu Dhulia as Annu's Father
Ashutosh Rana as Janardhan Panda
Reecha Sinha as Babli
Sanjay Mishra as Usman Bhai
Sikandar Kher as Guru Panda
R. J. Alok as DOP
Jay Patel as Mahendra Singh
Monazir Khan as Shailendra

Soundtrack

The music of the film was composed by Rana Mazumder with lyrics by Amitabh Bhattacharya, while Akriti Kakar wrote the song "Jobless" as a guest composer, singing it with her sisters Prakriti Kakar and Sukriti Kakar.

References

External links 
 

2019 romantic drama films
2010s Hindi-language films
Films directed by Tigmanshu Dhulia
Indian romantic drama films